The 2021 Toppserien was the 35th season of the highest women's football league in Norway. The season started on 22 May 2021 and ended on 13 November 2021.

Sandviken won their first Toppserien title. Rosenborg were the runners-up.

Format
The league consists of 10 teams this season, which will play each other twice (home and away) totalling 18 matches per team.

Teams

Teams information

League table

Results

Relegation play-offs
The league's ninth placed team, Lyn, faced Åsane, the 2021 First Division runners-up, in a two-legged play-off to decide who would play in the 2022 Toppserien.

Lyn won 3–1 on aggregate and both teams remained in their respective leagues.

Season statistics

Top scorers

Disciplinary

Players
Updated to matches played on 26 June 2021

Points classification: Yellow card - 1 point, Red card - 3 points.

Club
Updated to matches played on 26 June 2021

Points classification: Yellow card = 1 point, Red card = 3 points

Awards

References

External links
Official website
2021 Toppserien at Soccerway.com
2021 Toppserien at Worldfootball.net

Toppserien seasons
Top level Norwegian women's football league seasons
1
Norway
Norway